Bachia pyburni is a species of lizard in the family Gymnophthalmidae. The species is endemic to northern South America.

Etymology
The specific name, pyburni, is in honor of American herpetologist  (1927–2007). Accordingly, it is also known as Pyburn's bachia.

Geographic range
B. pyburni is found in northern Brazil, southeastern Colombia, and southern Venezuela.

Habitat

Reproduction
B. pyburni is oviparous.

References

Further reading
Costa HC, Bérnils RS (2015). "Répteis brasileiros: lista de espécies 2015 ". Herpetologia Brasileira 4 (3): 75–93. (in Portuguese).
Kizirian DA,  (1998). "A new species of Bachia (Squamata: Gymnophthalmidae) with plesiomorphic limb morphology". Herpetologica 54 (2): 245–253. (Bachia pyburni, new species).
Ribeiro-Júnior MA, Amaral S (2017). "Catalogue of distribution of lizards (Reptilia: Squamata) from the Brazilian Amazonia. IV. Alopoglossidae , Gymnophthalmidae". Zootaxa 4269 (2): 151–196.
Rivas GA, Molina CR, Ugueto GN, Barros TR,  (2012). "Reptiles of Venezuela: an updated and commented checklist". Zootaxa 3211: 1-64.

Bachia
Lizards of South America
Reptiles of Brazil
Reptiles of Colombia
Reptiles of Venezuela
Reptiles described in 1998
Taxa named by David A. Kizirian
Taxa named by Roy Wallace McDiarmid